The Rejimen Sempadan of the Malaysian Army was formed with the conversion of the 300-series Regular Force Reserve (Simpanan Angkatan Tetap) of the Rejimen Askar Wataniah (Territorial Army) into the 3rd regiment of the Infantry Corps. Its current strength of 11 infantry battalions being tasked with guarding the national border against all type of incursion, infiltration, smuggling and criminal activities. Currently, it is responsible for the northern border of Peninsular Malaysia and the border of East Malaysia with Indonesia. 

All Border Battalions are subordinated into a Border Brigade with a 30 Brigade HQ reporting to 2 Division HQ and 31st Brigade reporting to 1 Division HQ.

Battalions
The RS has a total of 6 battalions, all of which are standard infantry battalions:

References

Malaysia Army corps and regiments
Military units and formations established in 2008